George Whitworth (22 September 1927 - 16 March 2006) was an English footballer who played as a defender. He played for Liverpool, he made nine appearances during his time at the club.

External links
 LFC History profile

References

1927 births
English footballers
Liverpool F.C. players
2006 deaths
English Football League players
Association football defenders